South Dongting Lake, also known as The pearl of the Yangtze River, is a large freshwater lake located in the north of the province of Hunan, China, in the Dongting Lake region. The South Dongting Lake occupies approximately one-eighth of the total combined area of all wetlands in the world. The lake is internationally regarded as an important wetland and has been designated as a protected Ramsar site since 2002.

Geography
South Dongting Lake is located in the southwest of Dongting Lake, with an area of 1680 square kilometers. It has the characteristics of wetland with water immersion as lake and water falling as oasis.

References

Lakes of Hunan
Ramsar sites in China